Acta Zoologica Academiae Scientiarum Hungaricae is a peer-reviewed, open access scientific journal no-publication fee, publishing original research studies in the fields of animal taxonomy, systematics, biogeography, and ecology. It was established in 1954 under the title Acta Zoologica Hungarica (1984–1993). It is indexed in the Journal Citation Reports. The journal is also indexed in BIOSIS, Biological Abstracts, Abstracts of Entomology, CAB Abstracts, Forest Science Database, Current Contents, Human Genome Abstracts, Science Citation Index, and The Zoological Record.

See also
 Open access in Hungary

External links

Zoology journals
Animal taxonomy
Animal ecology